The 2019 Horizon League women's basketball tournament (also known as Motor City Madness) was the postseason women's basketball tournament for the Horizon League. It was held March 5 through March 12, 2019. Wright State defeated Green Bay in the finals to earn the conference's automatic berth into the 2019 NCAA women's tournament.

Seeds
The top 8 teams participated in the tournament. Teams were seeded by record within the conference, with a tiebreaker system to seed teams with identical conference records.

Schedule

Bracket

References

Horizon League women's basketball tournament
Horizon League women's basketball tournament
Basketball competitions in Detroit
2018–19 Horizon League women's basketball season
2019 in Detroit
Women's sports in Michigan
College basketball tournaments in Michigan